The 1948 Circuito del Garda was a motor race for Formula One cars held at Circuito del Garda, Salò on 24 October 1948. Giuseppe Farina won the race in a Ferrari 125, the first Grand Prix win for a purpose-built single-seater Ferrari. Farina also qualified on pole position and set fastest lap. Bruno Sterzi was second in a privately entered Ferrari 166 S and Luigi Villoresi third in a Maserati 4CLT/48.

Result

References

Garda Grand Prix
Grand Prix
Garda Grand Prix